Glade Creek is a stream in the U.S. state of Idaho. It is a tributary of the Lochsa River.

Glade Creek was named from the numerous glades along its course.

References

Rivers of Idaho County, Idaho
Rivers of Idaho